Edie Tarves (born 22 November 1961) is a Canadian equestrian. She competed in two events at the 1984 Summer Olympics.

References

External links
 
 
 

1961 births
Living people
Canadian female equestrians
Olympic equestrians of Canada
Equestrians at the 1984 Summer Olympics
Pan American Games medalists in equestrian
Pan American Games gold medalists for Canada
Equestrians at the 1991 Pan American Games
Sportspeople from Toronto
Medalists at the 1991 Pan American Games
21st-century Canadian women
20th-century Canadian women